Kalathūr Kilār (Tamil: களத்தூர்க் கிழார்) was a poet of the Sangam period to whom verse 44 of the Tiruvalluva Maalai.

Biography
Kalathūr Kilār was a poet belonging to the late Sangam period that corresponds between 1st century BCE and 2nd century CE. He hailed from the town named Kalathur. He is known for referring to the Mahabaratha as the "Fifth Veda" in his Tiruvalluva Maalai verse.

View on Valluvar and the Kural
Kalathūr Kilār has authored verse 44 of the Tiruvalluva Maalai. He opines about Valluvar and the Kural text thus:

See also

 Sangam literature
 List of Sangam poets
 Tiruvalluva Maalai

Citations

References

 
 

Tamil philosophy
Tamil poets
Sangam poets
Tiruvalluva Maalai contributors